The Liede is a little river that used to connect Haarlem Lake with the Spaarne, just south of Spaarndam, at a small lake called the Mooie Nel.

After the lake was pumped dry in 1852, the Liede became a side-river of the Ringvaart. The Liede and Mooie Nel are nowadays important for recreational boat sailing. There is also an ice-skating club called De Liede.

References

Geography of Haarlem
Rivers of North Holland
Rivers of the Netherlands